Sorbitorhynchus is an extinct genus of prehistoric sarcopterygians, or lobe-finned fish.

See also

 Sarcopterygii
 List of sarcopterygians
 List of prehistoric bony fish

References

Prehistoric lobe-finned fish genera